Nationality words link to articles with information on the nation's poetry or literature (for instance, Irish or France).

Events
 October 27 – English poet Alfred Tennyson settles at Farringford House on the Isle of Wight.

Works published in English

United Kingdom
 Mrs. Cecil Frances Alexander, Narratyve Hymns for Village Schools
 Matthew Arnold, Poems: a New Edition, the first collected edition of the author's poems; known as Poems: First Series (see also 1855); including "Sobrab and Rustum" and "The Scholar Gipsy"
 R. D. Blackmore, writing under the pen name "Melanter", Poems by Melanter
 Martha Browne, (a.k.a. Mattie Griffith) Poems
 Elizabeth Barrett Browning, Poems (see also Poems 1844, 1850, 1856)
 Caroline Clive, writing under the pen name "V", The Morlas
 Sydney Dobell, Balder
 Coventry Patmore, Tamerton Church-Tower (see also 1878)
 Alexander Smith, Poems, Scottish poet

United States
 Thomas Holley Chivers:
 Atlanta; or, the True Blessed Island of Poesy, a Paul Epic
 Memoralia; or, Phials of Amber Full of the Tears of Love
 Virginalia; or, Songs of My Summer Nights
 Samuel Longfellow, Thalatta: A Book for the Sea-side, compiled with Thomas Wentworth Higginson
 Lydia Huntley Sigourney, The Faded Hope
 William Gilmore Simms, Poems: Descriptive, Dramatic, Legendary and Contemplative, in two volumes, Charleston, South Carolina: John Russell
 Sarah Helen Whitman, Hours of Life
 John Greenleaf Whittier, The Chapel of the Hermits

Other
 Peter John Allan (died 1848), Poetical Remains of Peter John Allan, Esq., Canadian poet published in London
 Charles Harpur, The Bushrangers: a Play in Five Acts, and other Poems, Australia

Works published in other languages
 Hilario Ascasubi, Aniceto el Gallo, Argentina
 Álvares de Azevedo, Lira dos Vinte Anos, Brazil (posthumous)
 Paul Heyse, Lieder aus Sorrent ("Songs of Sorrento"), Germany
 Victor Hugo, Les Châtiments, France
 Friedrich Reinhold Kreutzwald, Kalevipoeg, Estonia (suppressed due to censorship)

Births
Death years link to the corresponding "[year] in poetry" article:
 February 18 - Ernest Fenollosa, American (died 1908)
 October 4 - Jane Maria Read, American poet and teacher (year of death unknown)

Deaths
Birth years link to the corresponding "[year] in poetry" article:
 February 3 – August Kopisch, German poet and painter (born 1799)
 April 28 – Ludwig Tieck, German (born 1773)
 October 27 – Maria White Lowell, American (born 1821)
 December 2 – Amelia Opie, English novelist, writer and poet (born 1769)
 Dayaram, Indian, Gujarati-language poet (born 1757)

See also

 19th century in poetry
 19th century in literature
 List of years in poetry
 List of years in literature
 Victorian literature
 French literature of the 19th century
 Poetry

Notes

19th-century poetry
Poetry